The Liberal Democrats' Rally for National Reconstruction-Vivotene  (Rassemblement des Démocrates Libéraux pour la Reconstruction nationale) is a political party of Benin led by Sévérin Adjovi. 
The party won at the presidential election of 5 March 2006 1.8% of the votes for its candidate Sévérin Adjovi.

Liberal parties in Africa
Political parties in Benin
Political parties with year of establishment missing